Arnprior Water Aerodrome  is located  south of the community. It is open from May until November.

See also
List of airports in the Ottawa area

References

Registered aerodromes in Ontario
Transport in Renfrew County
Seaplane bases in Ontario